Tim Burgess may refer to:
 Tim Burgess (musician) (born 1967), lead singer of British rock band The Charlatans
 Tim Burgess (politician) (born 1949), former mayor of Seattle, former longtime member of the Seattle City Council
 Timothy M. Burgess (born 1956), American federal judge
 Tim Burgess (born 1961), drummer of the pop group T'Pau